This is a list of African-American actors by birth order.

To be included in this list, the person must have a Wikipedia article and/or references showing the person is African American and a notable actor. The list is organized chronologically, grouping actors by their birth year.

1800 – 1859 
 Ira Aldridge 1807
 James Hewlett fl. 1821

1860s 
 Ernest Hogan 1865
 Matilda Sissieretta Joyner Jones (also known as The Black Patti) 1868
 George H. Reed 1866
 Bob Cole 1868

1870s 
 Madame Sul-Te-Wan 1873
 George Walker 1873
 Bert Williams 1874
 John Larkin 1877
 Bill Robinson 1878
 Jesse Graves 1879

1880s 
 Noble Johnson 1881
 Clinton Rosemond 1881
 Frank H. Wilson 1885
 Sam McDaniel 1886
 Dooley Wilson 1886
 Spencer Bell 1887
 Tim Moore 1887
 Clarence Muse 1889

1890s 
 Oscar Micheaux 1884
 Charles R. Moore 1893 
 Ernest Whitman 1893 
 Spencer Williams 1893
 Rex Ingram  1895
 Hattie McDaniel 1895
 Bill Walker 1896
 Ethel Waters 1896
 Evelyn Preer 1896
 Juano Hernandez 1896
 Johnny Lee 1898
 Paul Robeson 1898
 Lillian Randolph 1898
 Blue Washington 1898
 Oscar Polk 1899
 Duke Ellington 1899

1900s 
 Ruby Dandridge  1900
 Etta Moten 1901
 Adelaide Hall 1901
 Jester Hairston 1901
 Louis Armstrong 1901
 Louise Beavers 1902
 Everett Brown 1902
 Stepin Fetchit  1902
 Mantan Moreland 1902
 Fredi Washington 1903
 James Baskett 1904
 Pigmeat Markham 1904
 Eddie Anderson 1905
 Frederick O'Neal 1905
 Lillian Yarbo 1905
 Dudley Dickerson 1906
 Josephine Baker 1906
 Theresa Harris 1906
 Ernestine Wade 1906
 Fred Toones 1906
 Victoria Spivey 1906
 Alvin Childress 1907
 Cab Calloway 1907
 Canada Lee 1907
 Louis Jordan 1908
 Helen Martin 1909
 Katherine Dunham 1909

1910s 
 Nick Stewart (also known as Nicodemus or Nick O'Demus) 1910
 Scatman Crothers 1910
 Napoleon Whiting 1910
 Muriel Rahn 1911
 Rosetta LeNoire 1911
 Butterfly McQueen 1911
 Pearl Bailey 1911
 Nina Mae McKinney 1912
 Ernest Morrison 1912
 Herb Jeffries 1913
 Anise Boyer 1914
 Roy Glenn 1914
 Woody Strode 1914
 Juanita Moore 1914
 Fayard Nicholas 1914
 Willie Best (also known as Sleep 'n' Eat) 1916
 Jeni Le Gon 1916
 Ossie Davis 1917
 Lena Horne 1917
 Davis Roberts 1917
 Isabel Sanford 1917
 Ella Fitzgerald 1917
 James Edwards 1918
 Nipsey Russell 1918
 Nat 'King' Cole 1919

1920s 
 Hazel Scott 1920
 Allen "Farina" Hoskins 1920
 LaWanda Page 1920
 Esther Rolle 1920
 Beah Richards 1920
 Harold Nicholas 1921
 Ruby Dee 1922
 Dorothy Dandridge 1922
 Redd Foxx 1922
 Roscoe Lee Browne  1922
 Muriel Smith 1923
 Julius Harris 1923
 Cicely Tyson 1924
 William Horace Marshall 1924
 Matthew "Stymie" Beard 1925
 Sammy Davis Jr. 1925
 Rudy Ray Moore 1927
 Harry Belafonte 1927
 Rupert Crosse 1927
 Robert Guillaume 1927
 Brock Peters 1927
 Sidney Poitier 1927
 Eartha Kitt 1927
 Maya Angelou 1928
 Moses Gunn 1929
 Roxie Roker 1929

1930s 
 Abbey Lincoln 1930
 Raymond St. Jacques 1930
 James Earl Jones 1931
 Billie "Buckwheat" Thomas 1931
 Ivan Dixon 1931
 Marla Gibbs 1931
 Carl Gordon 1932
 Nichelle Nichols 1932
 Melvin Van Peebles 1932
 Godfrey Cambridge 1933
 Greg Morris 1933
 Flip Wilson 1933
 Wilbert "Bill" Cobbs 1934
 Diahann Carroll 1935
 Gail Fisher 1935
 Louis Gossett Jr. 1936
 Bill Cosby 1937
 Morgan Freeman 1937
 Ron O'Neal 1937
 Billy Dee Williams 1937
 Garrett Morris 1937
 Sherman Hemsley 1938
 Madge Sinclair 1938
 Fred Williamson 1938
 John Amos 1939
 Cleavon Little 1939
 Clarence Williams III 1939
 Yaphet Kotto 1939
Thalmus Rasulala 1939
 Paul Winfield 1939

1940s 
 Richard Pryor 1940
 John Witherspoon 1942
 Isaac Hayes 1942
 Art Evans (actor) 1942
 Richard Roundtree 1942
 Leslie Uggams 1943
 Georg Stanford Brown 1943
 Margaret Avery 1944
 Patti LaBelle 1944 
 Diana Ross 1944
 Ja'net Dubois 1945
 Charlie Robinson 1945
 James Avery 1945
 Ernie Hudson 1945
 Melba Moore 1945
 Danny Glover 1946
 Gregory Hines 1946
 Ben Vereen 1946
 Demond Wilson 1946
 Glynn Turman 1947 
 Joe Morton 1947
 Jimmie Walker 1947
 Grace Jones 1948
 Carl Weathers 1948
 Phylicia Rashad 1948
 Avery Brooks 1948
 Samuel L. Jackson 1948
 Lynne Thigpen 1948
 Nell Carter 1948
 Ted Lange 1948
 Pam Grier 1949
 Frankie Faison 1949
 Kene Holliday 1949
 Loretta Devine 1949

1950s 
 Howard E. Rollins Jr. 1950
 Dorian Harewood 1950
 Debbie Allen 1950
 Jo Marie Payton 1950
 Obba Babatundé 1951
 Alfre Woodard 1952
 Delroy Lindo 1952
 Reginald VelJohnson 1952
 Michael Dorn 1952
 Tom Wright 1952
 Clarke Peters 1952
 S. Epatha Merkerson 1952
 Lynn Whitfield 1953
 Robert Wisdom 1953
 Oprah Winfrey 1954
 Marsha Warfield 1954
 Dennis Haysbert 1954
 James Pickens Jr. 1954
 Tony Todd 1954
 Robert Gossett 1954
 Denzel Washington 1954
 Roger Guenveur Smith 1955
 Whoopi Goldberg 1955
 Clarence Gilyard 1955
 Clifton Powell 1956
 David Alan Grier 1956
 Keith David 1956
 Arsenio Hall 1956
 Khandi Alexander 1957
 Robert Townsend 1957
 Levar Burton 1957
 Bernie Mac 1957
 Steve Harvey 1957
 Spike Lee 1957
 Mario Van Peebles 1957
 Michael Clarke Duncan 1957
 Mykelti Williamson 1957
 Jenifer Lewis 1957
 Suzzanne Douglas 1957
 Michael Jackson 1958
 Angela Bassett 1958
 Reg E. Cathey 1958
 Giancarlo Esposito 1958
 Denise Dowse 1958
 Keenen Ivory Wayans 1958
 Tom Lister Jr. 1958
 Tony Cox 1958
 Ice-T1958
 Terrence C. Carson 1958
 Prince 1958
 Tamara Tunie 1959
 Victoria Rowell 1959
 Charlie Murphy 1959
 Irene Cara 1959

1960s 
 Regina Taylor 1960
 Courtney B. Vance 1960
 Anne-Marie Johnson 1960
 Damon Wayans 1960
 Rusty Cundieff 1960
 John Henton 1960
 Glenn Plummer 1961
 Larry Wilmore 1961
 Mark Curry  1961
 Chandra Currelley-Young 1961
 Eddie Murphy 1961
 Forest Whitaker 1961
 Laurence Fishburne 1961
 Dawnn Lewis 1961
 Kim Wayans 1961
 Kym Whitley 1961
 Tim Meadows 1961
 Lance Reddick 1962
 T'Keyah Crystal Keymáh 1962
 Leon Robinson (usually credited as simply Leon) 1962
 Kim Coles 1962
 Eriq La Salle 1962
 Wesley Snipes 1962
 Jasmine Guy 1962
 Richard Brooks 1962
 Tommy Davidson 1963
 Michael Beach 1963
 Wendell Pierce 1963
 Whitney Houston 1963
 Isaiah Washington 1963
 Vanessa L. Williams 1963
 Vanessa Estelle Williams 1963
 Darryl M. Bell 1963
 Harold Perrineau 1963
 Jennifer Beals 1963
 D.L. Hughley 1963
 Lela Rochon 1964
 Harry Lennix 1964
 Vivica A. Fox 1964
 Lenny Kravitz 1964
 Wanda Sykes1964
 Cedric the Entertainer 1964
 Holly Robinson Peete 1964
 Blair Underwood 1964
 Miguel A. Núñez Jr. 1964
 Kevin Michael Richardson - 1964
 Don Cheadle - 1964
 J. B. Smoove 1965
 Viola Davis1965
 K. Todd Freeman 1965
 Chris Rock 1965
 Martin Lawrence 1965
 Jeffrey Wright 1965
 Kadeem Hardison 1965
 Duane Martin 1965
 Steve Harris 1965
 Todd Bridges 1965
 The Lady of Rage 1966
 Gina Ravera 1966
 Janet Jackson 1966
 Hill Harper 1966
 Kristoff St. John 1966
 Gary Anthony Williams 1966
 Gary Dourdan 1966
 Halle Berry 1966
 Shanésia Davis-Williams 1966
 Karyn Parsons-Rockwell 1966
 Rachel True 1966
 Michael Kenneth Williams 1966 
 David Mann 1966
 Tamela Mann 1966
 Jeffrey D. Sams 1966
 LaVan Davis 1966 
 Toni Braxton 1967
 Stacey Dash 1967
 Phil LaMarr 1967
 Sherri Shepherd 1967
 Leslie Jones 1967
 Michael Jai White 1967
 Lisa Bonet 1967
 Salli Richardson 1967
 Mo'Nique 1967
 Jamie Foxx 1967
 Thomas Mikal Ford 1968
 Seth Gilliam 1968
 Tisha Campbell-Martin 1968
 Allen Payne1968
 Matthew St. Patrick1968
 Cuba Gooding Jr. 1968
 Orlando Jones 1968
 Eddie Griffin 1968
 Terry Crews 1968
 Phill Lewis 1968
 Will Smith 1968
 Tracy Morgan 1968
 LL Cool J 1968
 Gary Coleman 1968
 Andre Royo 1968
 Kimberly Brooks 1968
 Faizon Love 1968
 Paula Jai Parker 1969
 Jesse L. Martin 1969
 Erika Alexander 1969
 Morris Chestnut 1969
 Ice Cube 1969 
 Terrence Howard 1969
 Mariah Carey 1969
 Tyler Perry 1969
 Gina Torres 1969
 Chandra Wilson 1969
 D.B. Woodside 1969
 Dondre Whitfield 1969
 Reginald C. Hayes 1969
 Tichina Arnold 1969
 Wood Harris 1969
 Kim Fields 1969
 Aunjanue Ellis 1969

1970s 
 Queen Latifah 1970
 Cress Williams 1970
 Aisha Tyler 1970
 Octavia Spencer1970
 Anthony Anderson 1970
 Shemar Moore 1970
 Taraji P. Henson 1970
 Audra McDonald 1970
 Stephen Bishop 1970
 Henry Simmons 1970
 Nicole Ari Parker 1970
 Malcolm-Jamal Warner 1970
 Mike Epps 1970
 Golden Brooks 1970
 Regina Hall 1970
 Niecy Nash 1970
 DMX 1970
Nia Long  1970
Michael Rapaport  1970
N'Bushe Wright  1970
 Taye Diggs 1971
 Regina King 1971
 Erykah Badu 1971
 Rozonda Thomas 1971
 Tasha Smith 1971 
 Method Man 1971
 Lamman Rucker 1971
 Sanaa Lathan 1971
 Jada Pinkett Smith 1971
 Chris Tucker 1971
 Shawn Wayans 1971
 Katt Williams 1971
 Tupac Shakur 1971
 Snoop Dogg 1971
 Keegan-Michael Key1971
 Michael-Leon Wooley1971
 Richard T. Jones 1972
 Darrin Henson 1972
 Common 1972
 Maya Rudolph 1972
 Jill Scott 1972
 Sharon Leal 1972
 Essence Atkins1972
 Wayne Brady 1972
 Leonard Roberts 1972
 Anika Noni Rose 1972
 Marlon Wayans 1972
 Gabrielle Union 1972
 Deon Cole 1972
 Tracee Ellis Ross 1972
 Tyrin Turner  1972
 Omar Epps 1973
 Rockmond Dunbar 1973
 Yasiin Bey 1973
 Tempestt Bledsoe 1973
 Dave Chappelle 1973
 Michael Ealy 1973
 Keesha Sharp1973
 Lark Voorhies1973
 Mahershala Ali 1974
 Donald Faison 1974
 Russell Hornsby 1974
 Tamala Jones 1974
 Mekhi Phifer 1974
 Derek Luke 1974
 Joy Bryant 1974
 Omari Hardwick 1974
 Chad L. Coleman 1974
 De'Aundre Bonds 1974
 Lark Voorhees 1974
 Brian White 1975
 Lauryn Hill 1975
 Aisha Hinds 1975
 Malinda Williams 1975
 50 Cent 1975
 Tory Kittles 1975
 Sharif Atkins 1975
 Paula Patton 1975
 Larenz Tate 1975
 Jill Marie Jones 1975
 Andre Benjamin 1975
 Omar Dorsey 1975
 Sterling K. Brown 1976
 Kellie Shanygne Williams 1976
 Jaleel White 1976
 Rashida Jones 1976
 Rochelle Aytes1976
 Omar Gooding 1976
 Pooch Hall 1976
 Mike Colter 1976
 Chadwick Boseman 1976
 Erica Ash 1977
 Kerry Washington 1977
 Chris Bridges 1977
 Saycon Sengbloh 1977
 RonReaco Lee1977
 Robbie Jones1977
 Kel Mitchell 1978
 Wesley Jonathan 1978
 Tyrese Gibson 1978
 Kenan Thompson 1978
 Omar Benson Miller 1978
 Nelsan Ellis 1978
 Karimah Westbrook 1978
 Anthony Mackie 1978
 Danai Gurira 1978
 Aaliyah 1979 
 Lil Rel Howery 1979
 Jason Weaver 1979
 Kevin Hart 1979
 Nate Parker 1979
 Keshia Knight Pulliam1979
 André Holland1979
 Brandy Norwood1979
 Tituss Burgess1979
 Jordan Peele1979
 Cory Hardrict 1979
 Rutina Wesley 1979
 Tiffany Haddish 1979
 Alphonso McAuley 1979

1980s 
 Mehcad Brooks 1980
 Malcolm Barrett 1980
 Nick Cannon 1980
 Lamorne Morris 1980
 Neil Brown Jr. 1980
 William Jackson Harper 1980
 Marques Houston 1981
 Jennifer Hudson 1981
 Alicia Keys 1981
 Meghan Markle 1981
 Beyoncé Knowles 1981
 Leslie Odom Jr. 1981
 Jesse Williams1981
 Lance Gross1981
 Hosea Chanchez 1981
 Daveed Diggs 1982
 Brandon Scott 1982
 Damon Wayans Jr. 1982
 Columbus Short 1982
 Terrence Jenkins 1982
 Ron Funches 1982
 Wolé Parks1982
 Jussie Smollett1982
 Donald Glover 1983
 Brian Tyree Henry 1983
 Gabourey Sidibe 1983
 Trai Byers1983
 Robert Ri'chard 1983
 Arjay Smith 1983
 Tessa Thompson 1983
 DeVaughn Nixon 1983
 J. Lee 1984
 Lauren London 1984
 McKinley Belcher III 1984
 John David Washington 1984
 Rob Brown 1984
 Sam Richardson 1984
 Xosha Roquemore 1984
 Brandon T. Jackson 1984
 Scott Mescudi 1984
 Charles Michael Davis 1984
 Naturi Naughton 1984
 Lee Thompson Young 1984
 Dewanda Wise 1984
 Lena Waithe 1984
 Sonequa Martin-Green 1985
 Janelle Monáe 1985
 Sydney Morton1985
 Edwin Hodge 1985
 Raven-Symoné1985
 Aja Naomi King1985
 Jon Michael Hill1985
 Giovonnie Samuels 1985
 Nicole Beharie1985
 Collins Pennie1985
 Bryton James 1986
 Sasheer Zamata 1986
 Aldis Hodge 1986
 Elijah Kelley 1986
 Yahya Abdul-Mateen II 1986
 Condola Rashad1986
 Jurnee Smollett-Bell1986
 Marcus T. Paulk 1986
 Amber Stevens West 1986
 Kyla Pratt 1986
 Kali Hawk 1986
 Natalie Paul 1986
 Samira Wiley 1987
 Bre-Z 1987
 Margot Bingham 1987
 Michael B. Jordan 1987
 Jerrod Carmichael1987
 Jermaine Fowler 1987
 Jay Pharoah 1987
 Shad Moss 1987
 Jason Mitchell 1987 
 Naya Rivera 1987
 Teyonah Parris 1987
 Samira Wiley 1987
 Christel Khalil 1987
 Evan Ross 1988
 Zoe Kravitz 1988
 Jordin Sparks 1989
 Tristan Wilds 1989
 Danielle Brooks 1989
 Logan Browning 1989
 Jonathan Majors 1989
 Nafessa Williams 1989

1990s 
 Chris Warren 1990
 Christopher Massey 1990
 Trevante Rhodes 1990
 Jasmine Richards 1990
 Jordan Calloway 1990
 Marc John Jefferies 1990
 Tom Williamson 1990
 Lakeith Stanfield 1991
 Zora Howard 1991
 Dominique Fishback 1991
 Rome Flynn 1991
 Kyle Massey 1991
 Kiki Layne 1991
 Tyler James Williams 1992 
 Doc Shaw 1992
 Tequan Richmond 1992
 Rhyon Nicole Brown 1992
 Keith Powers 1992
 Paige Hurd 1992
 Raven Goodwin 1992
 Leon Thomas III 1993
 Antoinette Robertson 1993
 Keke Palmer 1993
 Imani Hakim 1993
 Bryshere Y. Gray 1993
 Shane Paul McGhie - 1993
 Kelvin Harrison Jr. 1994
 Algee Smith 1994
 Sierra McClain 1994
 Jaz Sinclair 1994
 Ryan Destiny 1995
 Sasha Lane 1995
 Shameik Moore 1995
 Parker McKenna Posey 1995
 Justine Skye 1995
 Justice Smith 1995
 Zendaya 1996
 Ajiona Alexus 1996
 Teala Dunn 1996
 Dee Dee Davis 1996
 Trevor Jackson 1996
 Jacob Latimore 1996
 Michael Evans Behling 1996
 Bobbe J. Thompson 1996
 Jamia Simone Nash 1996
 Cymphonique Miller 1996
 Brittany O'Grady 1996 
 Tyrel Jackson Williams 1997
 Jaylen Barron 1997
 Lauryn McClain 1997
 Sydney Park (actress) 1997
 Chloe Bailey 1998
 Jaden Smith 1998 
 Coco Jones 1998
 Lovie Simone 1998
 China Anne McClain 1998 
 Amandla Stenberg 1998
 Madison Pettis 1998
 Coy Stewart 1998
 Diamond White 1999

2000s
 Halle Bailey 2000
 Daniella Perkins 2000
 Marcus Scribner 2000
 Yara Shahidi 2000
 Willow Smith 2000
 Riele Downs 2001
 Caleb McLaughlin 2001
 Skai Jackson 2002
 Bailey Bass 2003
 Sydney Mikayla 2003
 Storm Reid 2003
 Quvenzhané Wallis 2003
 Marsai Martin 2004
 Shahadi Wright Joseph 2005
 Trinitee Stokes 2006
 Priah Ferguson 2006
 Jalyn Hall 2006
 Faithe Herman 2007
 Saniyya Sidney 2007

See also

 Lists of actors
 List of former African-American child actors
 Lists of African Americans

References

African-American
Actors
African-American